Activa is a proprietary brand under Kino Biotech Co. Ltd., a public listed company in the Taiwan's GreTai Securities Market (GTSM) with its head office in Singapore. Kino Biotech Co. Ltd. owns 100% stakes in Kino Life Science Ltd, TRN Marketing (M) Sdn. Bhd. and TRN Marketing Pte. Ltd. The Taiwan's GTSM database of public listed companies states that Kino Biotech Co. Ltd. has over 4500 points of sales in China, Singapore, Malaysia, Vietnam, Thailand and Indonesia.  Their core brands distributed are Kinohimitsu, Activa and Xpertise. 

Activa is distributed in malls similar to other players such as ROC and Avene. The channel of distributions include beauty salons, and pharmacies such as Watson, Century, Sasa.

References 

Personal care brands